The 2009 African Handball Champions League was the 31st edition, organized by the African Handball Confederation, under the auspices of the International Handball Federation, the handball sport governing body. The tournament was held from October 21–30 at the Palais des Sports in Yaoundé, Cameroon, contested by 11 teams and won by Groupement Sportif des Pétroliers of Algeria.

Draw

Preliminary round 

Times given below are in WAT UTC+1.

Group A

Group B

Group C

Knockout stage
Championship bracket

5-8th bracket

9-11th classification

Final ranking

Awards

References

External links
 Official website

African Handball Champions League
African Handball Champions League
African Handball Champions League
2009 Africa Handball Champions League
Handball in Cameroon
Events in Yaoundé